James Chapman (1799–1879) was the first Anglican Bishop of Colombo, in British Ceylon (now Sri Lanka), serving from 1845 to 1861.

Life 
He was educated at Eton and King's College, Cambridge, where he graduated Bachelor of Arts (BA) in 1823, and Cambridge Master of Arts (MA Cantab) in 1826. He was made deacon in Ely in 1824 and ordained priest the next year in Chichester. He became a Fellow of King's College, one of the Masters of Eton, and Evening Lecturer at Windsor. In 1834, he was appointed to the Rectory of Dunton Wayletts, in Essex, the patronage of which was with King's College. 

On 7 November 1845, he was consecrated as the first Bishop of Colombo at St Peter's Church, Colombo, and received the degree of Doctor of Divinity (DD) from his University. In 1851, Chapman founded S. Thomas' College when it was in Mutwal before it relocated to its present site in Mount Lavinia He resigned the See of Colombo in 1861, and was elected a Fellow of Eton College, and was presented by the College in 1863 to the Rectory of Wootton Courtenay, Somerset. In 1868, he was made Prebendary of Warminster in Wells Cathedral. He was the author of occasional Charges, Sermons and Journals. During the mid-1860s, he undertook several bishop's duties (including ordinations of deacons/priests and consecrations of church buildings) in the Diocese of Exeter. In the late 1860s, when Robert Eden, Bishop of Bath and Wells, was ill, Chapman also assisted him as Coadjutor Bishop of Bath and Wells.

He died in 1879.

See also
Church of Ceylon
Anglican Bishop of Colombo

References

External links
 The Church of Ceylon (Anglican Communion)
 Anglican Church of Ceylon News

1879 deaths
19th-century Anglican bishops in Asia
People educated at Eton College
Alumni of King's College, Cambridge
Sri Lankan Christian clergy
Place of birth missing
Place of death missing
1799 births
Anglican bishops of Colombo
Fellows of Eton College